Dactylostalix is a genus of flowering plants from the orchid family, Orchidaceae. At the present time (June 2014), there is only one known species, Dactylostalix ringens. It is native to Japan, the Kuril Islands, and Sakhalin Island.

See also
 List of Orchidaceae genera

References

External links

IOSPE orchid photos

Monotypic Epidendroideae genera
Calypsoinae genera
Kuril Islands
Flora of Sakhalin
Orchids of Russia
Orchids of Japan
Calypsoinae